Antal Róka (June 25, 1927 – September 16, 1970) was a Hungarian athlete who competed mainly in the 50 kilometre walk. He competed for a Hungary in the 1952 Summer Olympics held in Helsinki, Finland in the 50 kilometre walk where he won the bronze medal.

References

1927 births
1970 deaths
Hungarian male racewalkers
Olympic bronze medalists for Hungary
Athletes (track and field) at the 1952 Summer Olympics
Athletes (track and field) at the 1956 Summer Olympics
Olympic athletes of Hungary
European Athletics Championships medalists
Medalists at the 1952 Summer Olympics
Olympic bronze medalists in athletics (track and field)